Elmalı (literally "with apples" or "place with apples") is a Turkish word that may refer to the following places in Turkey:

People
 Havva Elmalı, Turkish female para arthlete

Places
 Elmalı, a town and district of Antalya Province
 Elmalı, Antalya, a village in the district
 Elmalı, Aziziye
 Elmalı, Biga
 Elmalı, Çameli
 Elmalı, Çamlıdere, a village in the district of Çamlıdere, Ankara Province
 Elmalı, Çorum
 Elmalı, Demirözü, a village in the district of Demirözü, Bayburt Province
 Elmalı, İskilip
 Elmalı, İznik
 Elmalı, Kemah
 Elmalı, Kulp
 Elmalı, Şavşat, a village in the district of Şavşat, Artvin Province
 Elmalı, Tercan
 Elmalı, Uzunköprü, a village in the district of Uzunköprü, Edirne Province
 Elmalı, Vezirköprü, a village in the district of Vezirköprü, Samsun Province

Places which has a different pronunciation of the same word with Elmalı
 Almaty, the capital city of Kazakhstan (which is a different pronunciation of the same word with Elmalı)

Other
 Elmalı-2 Dam, a dam